The  or  is a private museum of East Asian art in Kyōto, Japan. Established in 1926 by entrepreneur and politician Fujii Zensuke (1860–1934), it is the second oldest private museum in Japan, after the Ōkura Shūkokan. The collection, particularly strong in Chinese art from the Shang to the Qing, includes one National Treasure and nine Important Cultural Properties.

Name
The museum's name is taken from the Analects of Confucius and "expresses this feeling of good neighbourly relations".

Collection
The Yūrinkan's collection of Chinese art includes bronzes, ceramics, Buddhist statues, seals, calligraphic works, textiles, and paintings, as well as nearly a hundred manuscripts from Dunhuang, including twenty-three in Uighur and others in Tibetan, Mongolian, and Sanskrit. The museum's National Treasure consists of a fragmentary Tang manuscript of a commentary on the Spring and Autumn Annals.

Buildings
In a Chinese style both inside and out, it is topped by an octagonal pavilion with thirty-six thousand yellow glazed roof tiles dating to the time of the Qianlong Emperor. The building is a registered (as opposed to designated) Municipal Tangible Cultural Property.

The annex or "Fujii Saiseikai Yūrinkan Building No.2" dates to the beginning of the Taishō era (1912–1926). It is registered as a National Tangible Cultural Property, alongside the 1928 storage facility.

Access
The museum is open to the public on the first and third Sunday of each month, excepting January and August.

See also
 List of National Treasures of Japan (writings: Chinese books)
 Kyoto National Museum
 Hosomi Museum
 Heian Jingū

References

External links

 Yurinkan Museum

Museums in Kyoto
Museums established in 1926
1926 establishments in Japan